Frederick Young (1786–1874) was the founder of the Sirmoor Battalion later 2nd King Edward VII's Own Gurkha Rifles (The Sirmoor Rifles), the first Gurkha regiment to fight for the British.

Young was born in Culdaff, Inishowen peninsula, in the north of County Donegal, Ireland. He belonged to an important landlord family which came to Culdaff in the 17th century. Members of the family still reside in Culdaff House. His father was Rev. Gardiner Young who served as Rector in Moville and Coleraine.

Frederick Young went to India at the age of 15, joined the army and became a general. He founded the Ghurkha Regiment as a lieutenant, shortly after an incident involving Sir Rollo Gillespie during an invasion of Nepal. Referring to the establishment of the regiment, he said, "I came there one man; I came back three thousand".

He built a house at Mussoorie and planted the first tea and potato ever grown in the Himalayas.  He married Jeanette Bird in 1825 and had eight children. He settled in Ireland after he left the army and died in 1874. A memorial to the Young family can be seen in the village of Culdaff opposite the village church where members of the Young family are interred.

References 

 
 
 

1786 births
1874 deaths
People from County Donegal
British East India Company Army generals